Adam Chromý (born 24 June 1988) is a Czech orienteering competitor and junior world champion.

Career
Chromý became Junior World Champion with the Czech team in the relay in Dubbo in 2007, together with Štěpán Kodeda and Jan Beneš. He received a silver medal in 2005. He is a member of the Czech Orienteering Team, and started at the World Orienteering Championships in 2010 (Norway) and 2011 (France). He participated in the European Orienteering Championships in 2010 (Bulgaria) and 2012 (Sweden). He won two bronze medals at the World University Orienteering Championships in Spain in 2012.

Chromý is now a member of the Finnish orienteering club Kalevan Rasti. As a member of this team, he won Tiomila in 2010, 2011 and 2014.

See also
 Czech orienteers
 List of orienteers
 List of orienteering events

References

External links
 

1988 births
Living people
Czech orienteers
Male orienteers
Foot orienteers
21st-century Czech people
Junior World Orienteering Championships medalists